Badminton tournament was held at the 1962 Asian Games at the Istora Senayan in Jakarta, Indonesia from 25 August to 1 September 1962.

The host nation, Indonesia won five out of six possible gold medals.

Medalists

Medal table

Participating nations

References

External links
Badminton Asia

 
1962 Asian Games events
1962
Asian Games
1962 Asian Games